Patten (always written in lowercase, patten) is the pseudonym of a London-based electronic experimental musician and audiovisual artist.

Music

Patten began as an electronic music project by a London based musician calling himself D. While running a record label called Kaleidoscope, he released music  on CD-Rs since 2006.

The first official patten LP GLAQJO XAACSSO was released in September 2011 through UK label, No Pain in Pop.

In November 2013 patten signed to Warp Records, releasing the EOLIAN INSTATE EP soon after in an edition of 500 12" picture discs, with artwork by frequent visual collaborator Jane Eastlight (revealed in 2022 via social media by patten to be another pseudonym). 

February 2014 saw the release of the first LP for Warp, entitled ESTOILE NAIANT. In addition to the LP, 2014 saw patten release a number of free remixes of music by other artists on his website, called RE-EDITS.

In the summer of 2014, patten began to organise musical events at Power Lunches under the moniker 555-5555. The lineups featured sets from artists such as Logos, Karen Gwyer, Slackk, SFV Acid, Darkstar, Visionist, Fotomachine and Max Tundra.

In collaboration with Hisham Akira Bharoocha,
patten contributed to Doug Aitken's Station to Station project, recording an EP of new music created from found sound and improvised percussion onsite at the Barbican Centre. 

Furthermore, patten has created several remixes for artists like Giorgio Moroder and Björk.

In September 2016, his third album Ψ (Psi), was released with the vocals of a member known as A featuring across the record.

In May 2017, patten released Requiem, a four track digital-only EP, launched with a sold-out live audiovisual show at London's Institute of Contemporary Arts.

September 2019 saw the album FLEX released on patten's 555-5555 imprint, followed by a run of live audiovisual concerts and DJ sets across Europe. 

In 2020 three patten albums appeared in quick succession, starting with the beatless album, GLOW released in July during the early days of the coronavirus pandemic. GLOW was the first LP to be billed as 'made in lockdown'.  This was followed in August by GLO))), a heavy metal-inspired alternative version of GLOW. Aegis, the third album of 2020 was released in October, featuring ten tracks of experimental techno. 

Fact (UK magazine) published a mini-documentary on patten's history in August 2020. 

Two EPs followed, BURNER in 2021 with the track Eat Smoke (featuring Antipop Consortium's Beans (rapper)), and 2022's Desire Path EP, making Bleep (store)'s Tracks Of The Year with the track Kiss U. 

In January 2023, patten announced Mirage FM, the first album made using text-to-audio AI samples, due for release on April 14th 2023 via 555-5555.

Other Projects

In November 2017, the 555-5555 agency created a commissioned line of apparel for Dummy magazine.

In June 2018, patten created an online discussion forum, also named 555-5555.
 
Patten has created several audiovisual installations. In January 2018 a patten installation titled ‘3049’ premiered at Tenderpixel gallery in London. 

The audiovisual installation ‘CB-MMXVIII (I’ve been thinking of giving sleeping lessons)’ was commissioned and exhibited in December 2018 by Somerset House in London for the Claire Catterall curated exhibition Good Grief, on the enduring influence of Charles Schulz and Peanuts.

In 2022, patten was commissioned by Flat Time House to compose a soundtrack for Boyle Family (Mark Boyle (artist))'s 1960s film Beyond Image. The soundtrack was exhibited in a group exhibition called Gone Fishing, alongside works by John Latham (artist), Marlie Mul, and Boyle Family. The soundtrack was performed live by patten at Peckham Audio in the summer of 2022.

Making creative direction and design under the moniker 555-5555 since 2015, patten has made numerous projects including the visual world behind Dan Snaith’s Jiaolong label and Daphni releases, the visual identity and design for Nathan Fake's Blizzards_(album) album, and the live visual show for Caribou's Suddenly_(Caribou_album) album tour.

Partial discography

Albums
 GLAQJO XAACSSO, No Pain in Pop, 2011
 ESTOILE NAIANT, Warp, 2014. A limited number included a bonus CD of side A from the patten cassette tape Ship of Theseus (vol ii).
 Ψ, Warp, 2016
 FLEX, 555-5555, 2019
 GLOW, 555-5555, 2020
 GLO))), 555-5555, 2020
 Aegis, 555-5555, 2020

EPs
 EOLIAN INSTATE, Warp, 2013. Limited to 500 copies.
 Hisham Bharoocha & patten: June 30th, Vinyl Factory, 2015. Limited to 300 copies.
 Requiem, Warp, 2017. 
 Burner, 555-5555, 2021. 
 Desire Path, 555-5555, 2022. .

Cassettes
 Ship of Theseus (Vol II), Warp Records, 2014

Soundtracks (Released)
 3049 (Original Film Soundtrack), 555-5555, 2021

RE-EDITS
 RE-EDITS vol.3, Not on label, 2014
 RE-EDITS vol.1, Not on label, 2014
 RE-EDITS vol.8, Not on label, 2014
 RE-EDITS vol.17, Not on label, 2014
 RE-EDITS vol.2, Not on label, 2016
 RE-EDITS vol.9, 555-5555, 2018
 RE-EDITS: 54D3, 555-5555, 2020
 RE-EDITS: XM45, 555-5555, 2020

Selected Remixes
 My Love Is The Best, ALAK, Not On Label, 2011
 Hey Sparrow, Peaking Lights, Remixes, Weird World, 2011
 Two AM, Hauschka, Salon Des Amateurs Remixes, FatCat, 2012
 Keep It Low, The Hundred In The Hands, Keep It Low, Warp, 2012
 Most Of Missing, Orphan, Re:, Kaleidoscope, 2013
 Remember, Jon Hassell, Remixes 12", All Saints, 2014
 Mandan, Harold Budd, ARemixes 12", All Saints, 2014
 Silent Ascent, Downliners Sekt, Silent Ascent Remixes, Infiné, 2014
 Exxus, Glass Animals, ZABA, Wolf Tone, 2014
 Purplehands, Kwes., ilpix., Warp, 2014
 Metal Fatigue,  Jon Hassell, City: Works Of Fiction, All Saints, 2014
 Stonemilker, Björk, One Little Indian, 2015
 Delta Antliae, Georgio Moroder and Raney Shokne, Tron  Run/r (OST), Sumthing Else Music Works, 2016
 Falling Into Me, Let's Eat Grandma, Transgressive, 2018
 bEra, J Colleran, Because Music, 2018

CD-Rs
 Lacuna, Not on label, 2006
 There were Horizons, Kaleidoscope, 2007
 Sketching the Tesseract, Kaleidoscope, 2008
 EDITS, No Pain In Pop, 2011
 Ship of Theseus (Vol II): Side A, Warp Records, 2014

Early Downloads
 '09 tst2, Not on label, 2009
 '09 tst, Not on label, 2009

Other Known Aliases
 Actual Magic: WELCOME TO TODAY, Kaleidoscope, 2016

References

External links
 
 555-5555
 Kaleidoscope

British electronic musicians
Unidentified people